The Full Irish was a radio breakfast show on RTÉ 2fm. It ran for three years from 2002 – 2005 and was on air from 7 – 9 am. Ryan Tubridy presented; Shane O'Donoghue read out the leading news in sport and Avril Hoare read out the news. The "holy moley mug" was the main prize given out in competitions. It was a lighthearted show which discussed random topics.

The Full Irish began on Monday 18 March 2002 as an attempt by RTÉ to halt the haemorrhaging of listeners who were deserting Damien McCaul's breakfast show.

References

2002 radio programme debuts
Irish breakfast radio shows
RTÉ 2fm programmes
2002 establishments in Ireland